Hywel Swrdwal (fl. 1430 – 1475) was a poet in the Welsh language from Machynlleth, Powys.

Hywel composed poems on themes of patriotism and religion. He was the father of two sons, Ieuan ap Hywel Swrdwal and Dafydd ap Hywel Swrdwal.

Bibliography

Year of death unknown
People from Machynlleth
Year of birth unknown
15th-century Welsh poets
Welsh male poets